Biwi Aur Makan is a 1966 Hindi film directed by Hrishikesh Mukherjee. It is one of the masterpieces of Hrishikesh Mukherjee and was remade in different languages. This movie was based on the famous Bengali movie Joy Maa Kali Boarding. The movie was an inspiration for the Marathi movie Ashi Hi Banwa Banwi (1988),  Telugu movie Chitram Bhalare Vichitram(1991), two Kannada movies - Bombat Hendthi (1992) and Olu Saar Bari Olu(2003), Tamil movie Aanazhagan (1995), Hindi movie Paying Guests(2009), Punjabi movie as Mr & Mrs 420 (2014) and the Bengali movie Jio Pagla(2017). Some critics believe it is one of the finest comedy movies of Hindi cinema, parallel with Chupke Chupke, Padosan and Golmal.

The film was praised for Mehmood's timing and Biswajeet's beauty as Choti Bahu, Kesto Mukherjee's facial expression as Badi Bahu. The film was released with music composed by Hemanta Mukherjee. The film stars Biswajit, Kalpana Mohan, Kesto Mukherjee and Mehmood in lead roles.

Cast
 Biswajit Chatterjee as Arun
 Kalpana Mohan
 Mehmood as Pandey
 Shabnam as Leela
 Keshto Mukherjee as Kisan
 Badri Prasad
 Bipin Gupta
 Ashish Kumar as Shekhar
 Padma Khanna
 Brahm Bhardwaj

Soundtrack
The music of the film was composed by Hemant Kumar and the lyrics were penned by Gulzar.

 "Khul Sim Sim Khullam Khulla" by Manna Dey, Hemant Kumar and Bhela Gupta
 "Jane Kahan Dekha Hai" by Mohammed Rafi
 "Aa Tha Jab Janam Liya Tha" by Manna Dey
 "Aise Danton Mein Ungli Dabao Nahin" by Asha Bhosle
 "Dabe Labon Se Kabhi Jo Koi Salam Le" by Asha Bhosle and Lata Mangeshkar 
 "Sawan Mein Barkha Sataye" by Hemant Kumar

References

External links
 

Hindi films remade in other languages
1966 films
1960s Hindi-language films